East Barron is a rural locality in the Tablelands Region, Queensland, Australia. In the  East Barron had a population of 234 people.

History 
East Barron State School opened on 28 April 2015 and closed on 1964.

In the  East Barron had a population of 234 people.

References 

Tablelands Region
Localities in Queensland